A zariba (from ) is a fence which is made of thorns. Historically, it was used to defend settlements or property against perpetrators in Sudan and neighbouring places in Africa. An example would be as a pen to protect cattle and other livestock from predators such as lions, albeit often unsuccessfully.

See also

 Boma (enclosure)
 Compound (enclosure)
 Kraal
 Stockade

References 

Fences